Leka, Prince of Albania may refer to:
 Leka, Crown Prince of Albania (1939–2011), only son of King Zog I of Albania and former head of the Albanian royal family (1961–2011)
 Leka, Prince of Albania (born 1982), only son of Leka, Crown Prince of Albania, and current head of the Albanian royal family (since 2011)